Xerotricha gasulli is a species of air-breathing land snail, terrestrial pulmonate gastropod mollusks in the family Geomitridae, the hairy snails and their allies.

Distribution

This species is endemic to Spain.

References

 Bank, R. A.; Neubert, E. (2017). Checklist of the land and freshwater Gastropoda of Europe. Last update: July 16th, 2017

Fauna of Spain
Geomitridae
Endemic fauna of Spain
Gastropods described in 1950
Taxonomy articles created by Polbot